Amphigonia is a genus of moths of the family Noctuidae erected by Achille Guenée in 1852.

Description
Palpi with second joint reaching above the vertex of the head. Third joint in male curved forwards, with a tuft of hair on the inner side. Antennae of male very long and minutely ciliated. Thorax and abdomen smoothly scaled. Tibia hairy. Forewings with arched towards apex, which is produced and acute. Outer margin highly angled at center. Hindwings with produced outer margin to a curved point at vein 4.

Species
Amphigonia hepatizans Guenée, 1852
Amphigonia motisigna Prout, 1928

References

Catocalinae
Noctuoidea genera